Intraoral cameras (IOCs) are cameras used by dentists or doctors to show a patient the interior of their mouth, as an alternative to using a mirror.  They were first introduced in 1989 and are now widely used in dental offices. IOCs allow the patient to see a clear picture of the inside of their mouth, aiding the dentist in consulting with them on various treatment options.  Images can be saved to a patient's file for future reference.

Features 
The wand form factor is the industry standard, lightweight, compact, and maneuverable in the patient's mouth.

Various design options are also available:

 Wireless or corded with PC-USB, VGA, RCA, or S-Video connectivity
 Lightweight (approx, .25 lb / 110g)
 LED lighting
 Fixed or variable focus mechanisms (Dial and Slide)
 Magnification up to 100X
 Angle of view 0˚ or 90˚ 
 45˚ mirror attachment
 Periodontal pocket probe attachment with scale for measurement
 Attachment for single tooth closeups
 Fingertip image capture or foot switches
 SD card storage
 Specialized imaging software

See also
 Otoscope

Dentistry
Cameras by type